Defenders of the Faith may refer to:

 A Christian denomination
 A music album
 A book